Hồ Văn Trung (Chữ Hán: 胡文中, 1885–1958) was a Vietnamese writer.

Biography
Hồ Văn Trung has a courtesy name Biểu Chánh (表政), pseudonym Thứ Tiên (次仙), with art name Hồ Biểu Chánh (胡表政). He was born on 1 October 1885 at Bình Thành village, Gò Công province of Cochinchina.

Works

Translations
 Tân soạn cổ tích (Ancient tales retold, Saigon 1910)
 Lửa ngún thình lình (French literature, Saigon 1922)

Poems
 U tình lục (Sài Gòn – 1910)
 Vậy mới phải (Long Xuyên – 1913)
 Biểu Chánh thi văn (Tập i, ii, iii bản thảo)

Essays

 General Võ Tánh (Sài Gòn – 1926)
 Politic of education (Gò Công – 1948)
 Tùy bút thời đàm (Gò Công – 1948)
 Pétain cách ngôn Á đông triết lý hiệp giải (Sài Gòn – 1942)
 Gia Long khai quốc văn thần (Sài Gòn – 1944)
 Gia Định Tổng trấn (Sài Gòn)
 Chấn hưng văn học Việt Nam (Sài Gòn – 1944)
 Trung Hoa tiểu thuyết lược khảo (Sài Gòn – 1944)
 Đông Châu liệt quốc chí bình nghị (Bến Súc – 1945)
 Tu dưỡng chỉ nam (Bến Súc – 1945)
 Pháp quốc tiểu thuyết lược khảo (Bình Xuân – 1945)
 Một lằn chánh khí: Văn Thiên Tường (BX 1945)
 Nhơn quần tấn hóa sử lược (Gò Công – 1947)
 Âu Mỹ cách mạng sử (Gò Công – 1948)
 Việt ngữ bổn nguyên (Gò Công – 1948)
 Thành ngữ tạp lục (Gò Công – 1948)
 Phật tử tu tri (Gò Công)
 Nho học danh thơ (Gò Công)
 Thiền môn chư Phật (Gò Công – 1949)
 Địa dư đại cương (Gò Công)
 Hoàng cầu thông chí (Gò Công)
 Phật giáo cảm hóa Trung Hoa (1950)
 Phật giáo Việt Nam (1950)
 Trung Hoa cao sĩ, ẩn sĩ, xứ sĩ (1951)
 Nho giáo tinh thần (1951)

Memories
 Ký ức cuộc đi Bắc Kỳ (1941)
 Mấy ngày ở Bến Súc (1944)
 Đời của tôi: 1. Về quan trường, 2. Về Văn nghệ, 3. Về phong trào cách mạng
 Một thiên ký ức: Nam Kỳ cộng hòa tự trị (Gò Công – 1948)
 Tâm hồn tôi (Gò Công – 1949)
 Nhàn trung tạp kỷ (tập i, ii, iii Gò Công – 1949)

Dramas
Tình anh em (Sài Gòn – 1922)
Toại chí bình sinh (Sài Gòn – 1922)
Thanh Lệ kỳ duyên (Sài Gòn 1926 – 1941)
Công chúa kén chồng (Bình Xuân – 1945)
Xả sanh thủ nghĩa (Bình Xuân – 1945)
Trương Công Định qui thần (Bình Xuân – 1945)
Hai khối tình (Sài Gòn – 1943)
Nguyệt Nga cống Hồ (Sài Gòn – 1943)
Đại nghĩa diệt thân (Bến Súc – 1945)
Vì nước vì dân (Gò Công – 1947)

Short stories
Chị Hai tôi (Vĩnh Hội – 1944)
Thầy chùa trúng số (Vĩnh Hội – 1944)
Ngập ngừng (Vĩnh Hội)
Một đóa hoa rừng (Vĩnh Hội – 1944)
Hai Thà cưới vợ (Vĩnh Hội)
Lòng dạ đàn bà (Sài Gòn – 1935)
Chuyện trào phúng, tập I, II (Sài Gòn – 1935)
Chuyện lạ trên rừng (Bến Súc – 1945)
Truyền kỳ lục (Gò Công – 1948)

Novels

Who can do (Cà Mau 1912, imitated André Cornelis of Paul Bourget)
Ái tình miếu (Vĩnh Hội – 1941)
Bỏ chồng (Vĩnh Hội – 1938)
Bỏ vợ (Vĩnh Hội – 1938)
Bức thơ hối hận (Gò Công – 1953)
Cay đắng mùi đời (Sài Gòn – 1923, imitated Sans Famille of Hector Malot)
Cha con nghĩa nặng (Càn Long- 1929)
Ms Đào, ms Lý (Phú Nhuận – 1957)
Captain Kim Quy (Sài Gòn – 1923, imitated The Count of Monte Cristo of Alexandre Dumas)
Chút phận linh đinh (Càn Long – 1928, imitated En Famille of Hector Malot)
Con nhà giàu (Càn Long – 1931)
Con nhà nghèo (Càn Long – 1930)
Cư kỉnh (Vĩnh Hội – 1941)
Cười gượng (Sài Gòn – 1935)
Đại nghĩa diệt thân (Sài Gòn – 1955)
Dây oan (Sài Gòn −1935)
Đỗ Nương Nương báo oán (SG 1954)
Đóa hoa tàn (Vĩnh Hội – 1936)
Đoạn tình (Vĩnh Hội −1940)
Đón gió mới, nhắc chuyện xưa (Phú Nhuận – 1957)
Two husbands (Sài Gòn – 1955)
Two loves (Vĩnh Hội – 1939)
Two wives (Sài Gòn – 1955)
Hạnh phúc lối nào (Phú Nhuận – 1957)
Kẻ làm người chịu (Càn Long – 1928)
Crying alone (Càn Long – 1929)
Lá rụng hoa rơi (Sài Gòn – 1955)
Lạc đường (Vĩnh Hội – 1937)
Lẫy lừng hào khí (Phú Nhuận – 1958)
Lời thề trước miễu (Vĩnh Hội – 1938)
Mẹ ghẻ con ghẻ (Vĩnh Hội – 1943)
Một chữ tình (Sài Gòn – 1923)
Một đời tài sắc (Sài Gòn – 1935)
Một duyên hai nợ(Sài Gòn – 1956)
Nam cực tinh huy (Sài Gòn – 1924)
Nặng bầu ân oán (Gò Công – 1954)
Nặng gánh cang thường (Càn Long-1930)
Ngọn cỏ gió đùa (Sài Gòn – 1926, imitated Les Misérables of Victor Hugo)
Người thất chí (Vĩnh Hội −1938, imitated Crime and Punishment of Fyodor Dostoyevsky)
Nhơn tình ấm lạnh (Sài Gòn – 1925)
Những điều nghe thấy (Sài Gòn – 1956)
Nợ đời (Vĩnh Hội – 1936)
Nợ tình (Phú Nhuận – 1957)
Nợ trái oan (Phú Nhuận – 1957)
Ở theo thời (Sài Gòn – 1935)
Ông Cả Bình Lạc (Sài Gòn – 1956)
Ông Cử (Sài Gòn – 1935)
Sống thác với tình (Phú Nhuận – 1957)
Tại tôi (Vĩnh Hội – 1938)
Tân Phong nữ sĩ (Vĩnh Hội – 1937)
Tắt lửa lòng (Phú Nhuận – 1957)
Thầy Thông ngôn (Sài Gòn – 1926)
Thiệt giả, giả thiệt (Sài Gòn – 1935)
Tiền bạc, bạc tiền (Sài Gòn – 1925)
Tìm đường (Vĩnh Hội – 1939)
Tình mộng (Sài Gòn – 1923)
Tơ hồng vương vấn (1955)
Trả nợ cho cha (Sài Gòn – 1956)
Trọn nghĩa vẹn tình (Gò Công – 1953)
Trong đám cỏ hoang (Phú Nhuận – 1957)
Từ hôn (Vĩnh Hội – 1937)
Vì nghĩa vì tình (Càn Long – 1929)
Vợ già chồng trẻ (Phú Nhuận – 1957)
Ý và tình (Vĩnh Hội – 1938 – 1942)
Người vợ hiền (?)

In popular culture

Books
 Portrait of Hồ Biểu Chánh (Nguyễn Khuê, Saigon 1974)
 Page 56 of Dictionary of historical persons (Hanoi)

Films

 Ngọn cỏ gió đùa (1989)
 Con nhà nghèo (1998)
 Ân oán nợ đời (2002)
 Nợ đời (2004)
 Cay đắng mùi đời (2007)
 Tại tôi (2009)
 Tân Phong nữ sĩ (2009)
 Tình án (2009)
 Khóc thầm (2010)
 Lòng dạ đàn bà (2011)
 Ngọn cỏ gió đùa (2013)
 Lời sám hối (2014)
 Hai khối tình (2015)
 Con nhà giàu (2015)

References

External links

 The miraculous life of writer Hồ Biểu Chánh
 Career of writer Hồ Biểu Chánh
 Novels of Hồ Biểu Chánh
 Nhà văn khai sáng nền tiểu thuyết hiện đại Việt Nam
 Kỷ niệm 50 năm cụ Hồ Biểu Chánh qua đời

 
1885 births
1958 deaths
People from Tiền Giang province
Vietnamese male writers
Vietnamese male journalists